Kamenna Riksa is a village in Georgi Damyanovo Municipality, Montana Province, north-western Bulgaria.

References

Villages in Montana Province